John Schwada may refer to:

John Schwada (journalist), reporter for KTTV Fox 11 News in Los Angeles
John W. Schwada, first chancellor of the University of Missouri in Columbia, Missouri